The Hermes class were a series of four 20-gun ships, launched between 1811 and 1816. Two pairs of ships were produced, to slightly different designs – the first two had 20 guns and were unrated flush-decked ship-sloops, whilst the latter two were converted to 26-gun sixth-rates. The design was based on the ex-French 20-gun corvette , which the British had captured in 1796.

Milford Dockyard was closed following their construction, and the second pair were built at the new Pater (later Pembroke Dock) Dockyard on the south side of Milford Haven.

The second pair –  and  – were launched on the same date in 1816. They were modified at Plymouth Dockyard in 1820 and 1821 respectively, before their first commission, by the addition of quarterdecks and forecastle to what had originally been flush-deck vessels, and they were at that time re-classed as 26-gun sixth rate post ships.

The Cyrus class was based on the design of the Myrmidon of the Hermes class.

Ships in class 
 
 Builder: Milford Dockyard
 Ordered: 18 January 1810
 Laid down: May 1810
 Launched: 22 July 1811
 Completed: 7 September 1811 
 Fate: Grounded and burnt in action at Mobile in 1814.
 
 Builder: Milford Dockyard
 Ordered: 2 August 1811
 Laid down: July 1812
 Launched: 18 June 1813
 Completed: 6 February 1814 at Plymouth Dockyard
 Fate: Broken up at Portsmouth in 1823.
 
 Builder: Pater Dockyard
 Ordered: 28 November 1812
 Laid down: April 1815
 Launched: 10 February 1816
 Completed: 21 March 1816 
 Fate: Sold to break up at Alexandria in 1841.
 
 Builder: Pater Dockyard
 Ordered: 28 November 1812
 Laid down: March 1815
 Launched: 10 February 1816
 Completed: 26 March 1816 at Plymouth Dockyard 
 Fate: Broken up at Chatham in 1829.

References
 Rif Winfield, British Warships in the Age of Sail, 1793–1817, Chatham Publishing, London 2005.
 Davy Lyon, The Sailing Navy List – all the Ships of the Royal Navy 1688-1860, Conway Maritime Press, London 1993.

 
Sloop classes